St Blazey is an electoral division of Cornwall in the United Kingdom and returns one member to sit on Cornwall Council. The current Councillor is Pauline Giles, a Conservative.

Extent
St Blazey covers the town of St Blazey, and the hamlets of Tywardreath Highway, Porcupine, Penpillick. The hamlet of Bodelva is shared with the Par and St Blazey Gate division and the hamlet of Kilhallon is shared with the Fowey and Tywardreath division. The division covers 487 hectares in total.

Election results

2017 election

2013 election

References

St Blazey
Electoral divisions of Cornwall Council